was a Japanese novelist. He was awarded the 2010 Akutagawa Prize for the novel Kueki Ressha (苦役列車). Having dropped out of school at fifteen, Nishimura's lack of formal education and candidness concerning his lifestyle has drawn media attention.

Nishimura died in Tokyo on 5 February 2022, at the age of 54. Nishimura complained of poor health while in a taxi he boarded the night before, and was taken to the hospital. Police are investigating the cause of death.

See also 
 Seizo Fujisawa

References

1967 births
2022 deaths
21st-century Japanese novelists
Japanese essayists
People from Tokyo
Akutagawa Prize winners
Writers from Tokyo